Jens Michelsen Beck (1 January 1721  29 May 1791) was a Danish surveyor, cartographer, landowner and planter. On the island of Saint Croix in the Danish West Indies, he owned the Beck's Grove plantation. Beck later returned to Denmark, settling on Gentoftegård north of Copenhagen. His daughter Christiane was married to Ove Malling.

Early life
Beck was born on 1 January 1721 in Nyborg on the island of Funen, the son of Michael Svendsen Beck and Anne Nielsdatter. His father was a shoemaker.

Years on Saint Croix
As a young man Beck went to the Danish West Indies to work as a junior assistant for the Danish West India Company. He landed on Saint Thomas on 19 June 1742. In 1743, he transferred to Saint Croix. His salary was then 10 Danish rigsdaler per month. In 1745, he was promoted to senior assistant with a monthly salary of 14 Danish rigsdaler.

Beck created the first town plan for the city of Frederiksted as well as one of the most frequently reproduced historical maps of Saint Croix.

In 1750, Beck invested in plantation land on the western part of the island, establishing Beck's Grove. Two natural springs provided the estate with freshwater. In 1766, he held 86 slaves on the plantation.

Return to Denmark
 
In 1754, Beck returned to Denmark, leaving the management of Beck's Grove in the hands of an overseer, Adam Søbøtker.

He married on 17 September 1758 Louise Sophie Hagen, a daughter of the owner of Kong Salomons Apotek, Bernhard Hagen. The couple had eight children: Eleonora Sophia (1759-1826), Louise Henriette (1760-1831), Christiane (1761-1834), Frederica Amalia (1762-1762), Michael Bernhard (1764-<1777), Jens Julius (1767-1767), Carl Christian (1768-1818) and Frederik (1773-1832). The family lived at Gothersgade No. 215 from 1770 to 1882.

Beck's wife died in 1777. In 1779, he purchased Gentoftegård / Kløkers Gård( and settled there permanently with his six children.

Beck's son Michael returned to the island to take over the plantation but died shortly thereafter in a hurricane which destroyed many of the buildings, crops and forest. In 1782, Beck sold a piece of land in Frederikssted. In 1787, he also decided to sell the estate.

Beck's eldest daughter Eleonora Sophie Beck (1759–1829) was married to the jurist . The second oldest daughter Christiane Beck (1761-1834) was married to the historian and statesman  . The third oldest daughter Louise Henriette (1760-1831) was married to the Supreme Court attorney Peter Herlef (1756-).

Legacy

After Beck's death, Gentoftegård was taken over by his son-in-law Ove Malling. He erected a stone with an inscription commemorating his father-in-law on the property. It is now located outside the building Salem and Kløckershave.

References

External links

 Jens Michelsen Beck at geni.com

1721 births
1791 deaths
18th-century Danish landowners
Danish cartographers
Danish planters
Danish slave owners
Danish sugar plantation owners
People from Nyborg